Gulati is a surname found among Khatri and Arora communities of Punjab region.
Notable people bearing the name Gulati include:

Aashim Gulati (born 1995), Indian model and actor
Aman Singh Gulati (born 2000), Indian Visual Artist
Ashok Gulati (born 1954), Indian agricultural economist
Dharampal Gulati (1923–2020), Indian businessman
Gautam Gulati (born 1987), Indian actor
Himanshu Gulati (born 1988), Indian-Norwegian politician
Jai Gulati, Indian-American businessman
Martha Gulati (born 1969), Canadian physician
Parul Gulati (born 1994), Indian actress
Ranjay Gulati, Indian-American organizational behavior theorist
Ravi Gulati (born 1973), Indian social activist
Sakshi Gulati (born 1986), Indian model and actress
Shobna Gulati (born 1966), English actress, writer and dancer of Indian origin
Shweta Gulati (born 1979), Indian actress
Sonali Gulati, Indian-American filmmaker and educator
Sunil Gulati (born 1959), Indian-American sports official, president of the United States Soccer Federation
Yash Gulati, Indian orthopedic surgeon

See also
21429 Gulati (1998 FG104), a main-belt asteroid discovered in 1998

References